Plasma gun may refer to:

Plasma weapon, a type of raygun that fires a stream, bolt, pulse or toroid of plasma
Plasma torch, a device for generating a directed flow of plasma
Plasma railgun, a linear accelerator which, like a projectile railgun, uses two long parallel electrodes to accelerate a "sliding short" armature
Dense plasma focus, a type of plasma generating system originally developed as a fusion power device

See also 
Plasma (disambiguation)
Plasma cannon (disambiguation)